Campiglossa argyrocephala is a species of tephritid or fruit flies in the genus Campiglossa of the family Tephritidae.

Distribution
The species is found in the United Kingdom, Scandinavia, south to France, Austria, Ukraine, Kazakhstan.

References

Tephritinae
Insects described in 1844
Diptera of Europe
Taxa named by Hermann Loew